Margaret Ann "Peggy" McCarthy (born March 1, 1956 in Urbana, Illinois), is an American rower.

Olympian
She competed in the 1976 Summer Olympics and was a crew member of the American boat which won the bronze medal in the eights event. She qualified for the 1980 U.S. Olympic team but was unable to compete due to the 1980 Summer Olympics boycott. McCarthy did however receive one of 461 Congressional Gold Medals created especially for the spurned athletes.

References 

1956 births
Living people
Rowers at the 1976 Summer Olympics
Olympic bronze medalists for the United States in rowing
American female rowers
Medalists at the 1976 Summer Olympics
Congressional Gold Medal recipients
21st-century American women